Most of All: The Best of Deborah Harry is a compilation album of recordings by Deborah Harry, released by Chrysalis Records in 1999.

The compilation gathers material from Harry's four solo albums for the Chrysalis label, KooKoo, Rockbird, Def, Dumb & Blonde, and Debravation; and unlike 1998's Deborah Harry Collection, it contains most of the singles issued between the years 1981 and 1993, including Harry's biggest solo hits "French Kissin' in the USA" and "I Want That Man". Most of All also includes non-album singles such as "Rush Rush", "Feel the Spin", and her 1990 duet with Iggy Pop, "Well, Did You Evah!", as well alternative single mixes not available on the regular studio albums.

EMI issued remixed dance versions of Harry's 1989 hit "I Want That Man" to promote the album, with the updated mixes by D-Bop and Almighty. Most Of All concludes with two of these mixes.

Track listing
"I Want That Man" (Original) (Bailey, Currie) – 3:42
 From 1989 album Def, Dumb and Blonde.
"French Kissin' in the USA" (Album Version) (Lorre) – 5:11
 From 1986 album Rockbird.
"Brite Side"  (Harry, Stein) – 4:34
 From 1989 album Def, Dumb and Blonde.
"Sweet and Low" (Phil Harding Single Mix) (C., Harry) – 4:22
 Original version appears on 1989 album Def, Dumb and Blonde.
"Free to Fall" (7" Edit) (Harry, Justman) – 4:15
 Original version appears on 1986 album Rockbird.
"Well, Did You Evah!" (Porter) – 3:28
Performed by Deborah Harry and Iggy Pop. From the 1990 HIV/AIDS benefit album Red Hot + Blue.
"I Can See Clearly" (Album Version) (Baker, McIlwaine) – 3:51
From 1993 album Debravation.
"Strike Me Pink" (Bernstein, Dudley, Harry) – 4:01
From 1993 album Debravation.
"Communion" (7" Edit) (Harry, Pratt) – 4:27
Original version appears on 1993 album Debravation.
"Backfired" (7" Edit) (Edwards, Rodgers) – 3:36
Original version appears on 1981 album KooKoo
"In Love with Love" (Stock Aitken Waterman 7" Edit) (Harry, Stein) – 3:20
 Original version appears on 1986 album Rockbird.
"Rush Rush" (Extended Version) (Harry, Moroder) – 4:46
Original version appears on 1983 soundtrack album Scarface.
"The Jam Was Moving" (7" Mix) (Edwards, Rodgers) – 3:00
From 1981 album KooKoo.
"Feel the Spin"  (Extended Dance Version) (C., Harry, Jellybean) – 6:48
 Original version appears on 1985 soundtrack album Krush Groove
"Maybe for Sure" (Harry, Stein) – 4:29
 From 1989 album Def, Dumb and Blonde.
"Rockbird" (Harry, Stein) – 3:10
 From 1986 album Rockbird.
"I Want That Man" (Almighty Definitive Mix Radio Edit) (Bailey, Currie) – 4:04
 Original version appears on 1989 album Def, Dumb and Blonde.
"I Want That Man" (D-Bop's 11.59 Vocal Mix Radio Edit) (Bailey, Currie) – 4:01
 Original version appears on 1989 album Def, Dumb and Blonde.

Production
 Nile Rodgers – producer for Chic Organization Ltd. "Backfired" and "The Jam Was Moving"
 Bernard Edwards – producer for Chic Organization Ltd. "Backfired" and "The Jam Was Moving"
 Giorgio Moroder – producer "Rush Rush"
 John "Jellybean" Benitez – producer "Feel The Spin"
 Seth Justman – producer "French Kissin' In The USA", "In Love With Love" and "Free To Fall"
 Stock Aitken Waterman – additional production and remix "In Love With Love"
 Mike Chapman – producer "Maybe For Sure"
 Tom Bailey (musician) – producer "I Want That Man"
 Eric "E.T." Thorngren – producer "I Want That Man"
 Ben Grosse – additional production and remix "I Want That Man"
 Chris Stein – producer "Brite Side", "Sweet And Low" and "Well Did You Evah!"
 Deborah Harry – producer "Brite Side" and "Sweet And Low"
 Toni C. – producer "Sweet And Low"
 Steve Lillywhite – producer "Well Did You Evah!"
 Phil Harding – additional production and remix "Sweet And Low"
 Arthur Baker – additional production and remix "Brite Side", producer "I Can See Clearly"
 Anne Dudley – producer "Strike Me Pink"
 Guy Pratt – producer "Communion"
 Jon Dixon – additional production and remix "I Want That Man" (Almighty Mix)
 Martyn Norris – additional production and remix "I Want That Man" (Almighty Mix)
 Dave Cross – additional production and remix "I Want That Man" (D-Bop Mix)
 Andy Alder – additional production and remix "I Want That Man" (D-Bop Mix)
 Tony Burch – mastering at Abbey Road Studios
 Dave Cross – compilation and sleeve notes

References

Debbie Harry albums
1999 greatest hits albums
Chrysalis Records compilation albums